Cosmopterix zenobia is a moth in the  family Cosmopterigidae. It is found on Java.

References

Natural History Museum Lepidoptera generic names catalog

zenobia